Ali Ibrahimaj (born 18 August 1991) is a German professional footballer who plays as a midfielder for VfR Mannheim.

Personal life
Ibrahimaj is of Albanian descent.

References

1991 births
German people of Albanian descent
People from Rüsselsheim
Sportspeople from Darmstadt (region)
Footballers from Hesse
21st-century German people
Living people
German footballers
Association football midfielders
Sportfreunde Siegen players
SV Waldhof Mannheim players
SV Sandhausen players
KFC Uerdingen 05 players
FC Gießen players
VfR Mannheim players
Regionalliga players
2. Bundesliga players
3. Liga players
Oberliga (football) players
Hessenliga players